The Kolenté River (also known as the Great Scarcies River) is a river in Guinea and Sierra Leone. The river forms a portion of the international border between the two countries. It empties into the Atlantic Ocean at Barlo Point, Sierra Leone. In Guinea, it is known as the Kolenté and in Sierra Leone, it is known as the Great Scarcies.

The Little Scarcies River empties into the same bay of the Atlantic Ocean just to the south of the Great Scarcies River.  This area was settled by the Temne people who migrated from Futa Jalon to the north.

References

Rivers of Guinea
Rivers of Sierra Leone
International rivers of Africa
Guinea–Sierra Leone border
Border rivers